Rhabderemiidae is a family of sponges belonging to the order Biemnida.

Genera:
 Rhabderemia Topsent, 1890

References

Sponge families